"Never Ending Song of Love" is a song written by Delaney Bramlett, and, according to some sources, by his wife Bonnie Bramlett. It was originally recorded with their band, Delaney & Bonnie & Friends, in 1971 on the album Motel Shot. Released as a single by Atco Records the same year, "Never Ending Song of Love" became Delaney & Bonnie's greatest hit on the pop charts, reaching a peak of No. 13 on the Billboard Hot 100 and No. 8 on Easy Listening.  It reached No. 16 in Australia.

A cover version by The New Seekers was a major hit in the United Kingdom and Ireland in 1971.  It spent a few weeks at No. 2 in the UK charts and in South Africa, and reached No. 1 in the Irish charts. It was featured on their album of the same name.

As of 2008, "Never Ending Song of Love", had been covered by over 100 artists.

Chart history

Weekly charts
Delaney & Bonnie

Year-end charts
Delaney & Bonnie

New Seekers

Other cover versions
On the country music charts, at least three versions have become hits: 
Dickey Lee recorded a version at the same time as Delaney & Bonnie's original, which reached No. 8 on Billboard'sHot Country Singles charts. 
Eleven years later, in 1982, The Osmond Brothers had a minor hit with the song, which reached No. 43 on the country charts. 
Crystal Gayle's last U.S. chart hit was a cover of the song, which reached No. 72 on the country chart in 1990.
A French-language cover of the song (as "Un amour qui ne veut pas mourir") was also recorded by Canadian singer Renée Martel in 1972 as one of the first songs she recorded after transitioning from pop to country music.

References

1971 songs
1971 singles
1982 singles
1990 singles
Irish Singles Chart number-one singles
Number-one singles in New Zealand
The New Seekers songs
Delaney and Bonnie songs
Dickey Lee songs
The Osmonds songs
Crystal Gayle songs
Atco Records singles
Song recordings produced by Delaney Bramlett